The Euratom Treaty, officially the Treaty establishing the European Atomic Energy Community, established the European Atomic Energy Community. It was signed on 25 March 1957 at the same time as the Treaty establishing the European Economic Community (EEC Treaty).

The Euratom Treaty is less well known because of the lower profile of the organisation that it founded. The EEC has evolved into what is now the European Union, but Euratom has remained much the same as it was in 1957 although it is governed by the institutions of the European Union. It was established with its own independent institutions, but the 1967 Merger Treaty merged the institutions of Euratom and the European Coal and Steel Community with those of the EEC.

The Euratom treaty has seen very little amendment because of later sensitivity surrounding nuclear power in European public opinion. That has caused some to argue that it has become too outdated, particularly in the areas of democratic oversight. It was not included as part of the (unratified) Treaty establishing a Constitution for Europe, which sought to combine all previous treaties, over fears that including nuclear power in the treaty would turn more people against it. Nevertheless, it is one of the active treaties of the European Union.

Background and timeline

See also
 Euratom
 History of the European Coal and Steel Community (1945–1957)
 European Economic Community
 Treaty establishing the European Economic Community

References

External links
 
 Documents of the treaty establishing the European Atomic Energy Community on Eur-Lex
 Treaties overview on EUR-Lex
 Documents of Treaty of Rome's negotiations are at the Historical Archives of the EU in Florence

1950s in Rome
1957 in Europe
1957 in Italy
Treaties concluded in 1957
Treaties entered into force in 1958
Founding treaties of the European Union
Treaty
Nuclear technology treaties
Treaties of Austria
Treaties of Bulgaria
Treaties of Belgium
Treaties of Croatia
Treaties of Cyprus
Treaties of the Czech Republic
Treaties of Denmark
Treaties of Estonia
Treaties of Finland
Treaties of the French Fourth Republic
Treaties of West Germany
Treaties of Greece
Treaties of Hungary
Treaties of Ireland
Treaties of Italy
Treaties of Latvia
Treaties of Lithuania
Treaties of Luxembourg
Treaties of Malta
Treaties of the Netherlands
Treaties of Poland
Treaties of Portugal
Treaties of Romania
Treaties of Slovakia
Treaties of Slovenia
Treaties of Spain
Treaties of Sweden
Treaties of the United Kingdom
Treaties extended to Åland
March 1957 events in Europe
Events in Rome